Orange County, Florida (located in Central Florida), operates a system of county roads that serve all portions of the county. The Orange County Public Works Department, Roads and Drainage Division, is responsible for maintaining all of the Orange County roads. Most of the county roads are city streets and rural roads.

The numbers and routes of all state roads are assigned by the Florida Department of Transportation (FDOT), while county road numbers are assigned by the counties, with guidance from FDOT. North-south routes are generally assigned odd numbers, while east-west routes are generally assigned even numbers.

List of County Roads in Orange County, Florida

References

State of Florida, Dept. of Transportation, Survey and Mapping Office: General Highway Map of Orange County, Florida
FDOT GIS data, accessed January 2014

 
County